Frank Franz  (born 21 November 1978) is a German politician who has been the leader of the far-right National Democratic Party of Germany (NPD) since 2014. He was formerly the national chairman of the NPD in the German state of Saarland from 2005 to 2011, and national press officer for the NPD from 2011 to 2014.

Biography 
Franz was born in Völklingen. From 1997 to 2004, he served in the Bundeswehr, which he left as a Staff Sergeant. From 2007 onwards he worked as a programmer and artist, and owns an agency that handles the NPD's Internet activities.

Internally, Franz is controversial, as he is seen as a protégé of Peter Marx, who was not confirmed as the party's Secretary General in the wake of a failed coup attempt in early 2009.

Franz is separated from his wife, with whom he has three children. Since 2015, he has been dating a woman named Patricia Koperski, who guest-starred on German soap opera GZSZ and owns a right-wing publishing house.

References

1978 births
National Democratic Party of Germany politicians
Living people